Hasan Bozbey (born 1928) was a Turkish wrestler. He competed in the men's Greco-Roman bantamweight at the 1952 Summer Olympics.

References

External links
 

1928 births
Possibly living people
Turkish male sport wrestlers
Olympic wrestlers of Turkey
Wrestlers at the 1952 Summer Olympics
Place of birth missing